Stryker High School is a public high school in Stryker, Ohio.  It is the only high school in the Stryker Local Schools district.  Their nickname is the Panthers.  They are members of the Buckeye Border Conference.

In February 2016, Stryker announced plans to bring back their football team after 85 years.  They intend to play at the junior high level before working their way up to a varsity program.  In May 2017, Stryker announced that they will join the Toledo Area Athletic Conference for football only beginning with the 2018 season.

References

External links
 District Website

High schools in Williams County, Ohio
Public high schools in Ohio